Paulo Marques (June 29, 1948, Carpina - September 14, 2006, Recife) was a Brazilian journalist and broadcaster. Paulo was also a politician, having been elected to the city council of Carpina, Pernambuco, Brazil and to the state and federal legislatures. He was divorced, lived with a companion and had three children: Allana Marques, from the first marriage and two with his last companion, João Paulo Holanda e Paulo Marques Filho.

References

1948 births
2006 deaths
Brazilian journalists
Male journalists
Deaths from brain cancer in Brazil
Members of the Chamber of Deputies (Brazil) from Pernambuco
20th-century journalists